"The Lost Get Found" is the lead single from Christian pop artist Britt Nicole's third album The Lost Get Found. A mid-tempo pop song, "The Lost Get Found" was released on June 16, 2009, to digital stores. It peaked at No. 1 on Christian radio and No. 8 on Billboard's Hot Christian Songs chart.

Background
The song was written by Britt Nicole and Ben Glover. Lyrically, the track speaks of stepping out for Christ.

Chart performance
For the week ending August 22, 2009, "The Lost Get Found" peaked at No. 8 on Billboards Hot Christian Songs chart. It stayed on the chart for 11 weeks. The song was also No. 1 on Radio and Records Christian CHR Chart for eight consecutive weeks.

Music video
The official video for the song was released on YouTube October 30, 2009. It was later released to iTunes on November 17. The video follows Britt taking a road trip and telling real people about Jesus Christ.

Track listings
 Digital download "The Lost Get Found" — 3:25

 Digital extended play'''
 "The Lost Get Found" (Karaoke) - 3:21
 "The Lost Get Found" (Remix) - 3:43
 "The Lost Get Found" (Music Video) - 3:34

Other appearances
"The Lost Get Found" was featured on the album. WOW Hits 2010. She also recorded an acoustic version of the song for her 2010 extended play Acoustic''.

Charts

References

2009 singles
Britt Nicole songs
2009 songs
Songs written by Ben Glover
Sparrow Records singles
Song recordings produced by Dan Muckala